Tunisia, participated at the 1995 All-Africa Games held in Harare, Zimbabwe. She won 39 medals.

Medal summary

Medal table

See also
 Tunisia at the All-Africa Games

References

1995 All-Africa Games
1995
1995 in Tunisian sport